is a Japanese rugby union player who plays as a scrumhalf.

In his home country he plays for the Kubota Spears whom he joined in 2013.   He was also named in the first ever  squad which will compete in Super Rugby from the 2016 season.

References

1989 births
Living people
Japanese rugby union players
Rugby union scrum-halves
Kubota Spears Funabashi Tokyo Bay players
Sportspeople from Nara Prefecture
Sunwolves players
Japan international rugby union players